Adell is a ghost town in Sheridan County, Kansas, United States.

History
Adel was issued a post office in 1879. The post office was renamed Adell in 1885, then discontinued in 1892.

References

Further reading

External links
 Sheridan County maps: Current, Historic, KDOT

Former populated places in Sheridan County, Kansas
Former populated places in Kansas